Robert Bell (after 1827 – after 1883) was a politician in Ontario, Canada. He was a Conservative member of the Legislative Assembly of Ontario from 1875 to 1883 who represented the riding of Toronto West.

He was born in Toronto, the son of John Bell, a building contractor who came from Ireland in 1823. In 1853, Robert Bell married Matilda Clegg. He was chairman of the board of Waterworks Commissioners in Toronto from 1874 to 1877 and also served on the city council from 1860 to 1873.  He was deputy Grand Master of the Royal Black chapter of Orangemen of British America in 1875.

External links

The Canadian parliamentary companion, 1877, CH Mackintosh
History of Toronto and County of York, Ontario ..., GM Adam (1885)

Progressive Conservative Party of Ontario MPPs
Canadian people of Ulster-Scottish descent
19th-century Canadian politicians

Year of birth uncertain
Year of death uncertain